The NCPEDP-Mphasis Universal Design Awards are given every year on the eve of Independence Day of India to honour individuals and organisations doing exemplary work towards the cause of accessibility and thus ensuring a life of equality and dignity for persons with disabilities.

In order to spread awareness on Universal Design and to popularise this concept, National Centre for Promotion of Employment for Disabled People (NCPEDP), with the support of Mphasis, instituted these award in 2010.

Every year, these are given away in 3 categories: People with disabilities; Working Professionals' and Corporates or Organisations. For latest details about the Universal Design Awards please visit the NCPEDP website

NCPEDP-Mphasis Universal Design Awards, 2022

NCPEDP-Mphasis Universal Design Awards,2020

NCPEDP-Mphasis Universal Design Awards,2019

NCPEDP-Mphasis Universal Design Awards,2018

NCPEDP-Mphasis Universal Design Awards,2017

NCPEDP-Mphasis Universal Design Awards,2016

NCPEDP-Mphasis Universal Design Awards,2015

NCPEDP-Mphasis Universal Design Awards,2014

NCPEDP-Mphasis Universal Design Awards,2013

NCPEDP-Mphasis Universal Design Awards,2012

NCPEDP-Mphasis Universal Design Awards,2011

NCPEDP-Mphasis Universal Design Awards,2010

References

Design awards
Disability in India
Accessibility